Dominic Keating (né Power; born 1 July 1961) is a British television, film and theatre actor known for his portrayals of Tony in the Channel 4 sitcom Desmond's and Lieutenant Malcolm Reed on Star Trek: Enterprise.

Early life and education 
Keating was born Dominic Power in Leicester to an Irish father; his grandfather, a brigadier, was awarded an OBE. His first stage performance was in primary school, as a character in The Ragged School. He then attended Uppingham School.

After graduating from the University College London with first class honours in history, he tried various jobs before deciding to be a professional actor. Since there was another Dominic Power already represented by the actor's union Equity, he took his mother's maiden name of Keating. To obtain his Equity card, he worked in a drag act called Feeling Mutual.

Career

Theatre
Keating had success on the UK stage before working as a television and film actor. He originated the roles of Cosmo in Philip Ridley's The Pitchfork Disney, and Bryan in Michael Wall's Amongst Barbarians, for which he won a Mobil Award. He has also done stage work in the UK and Los Angeles, including the one-man play The Christian Brothers at King's Cross, The Best Years of Your Life at the Man in the Moon Theatre, Screamers at the Edinburgh Playhouse Festival, and Alfie at the Tiffany Theater.

Television
Keating first received major attention in the UK with a semi-regular role as Tony in the Channel 4 sitcom Desmond's (1989–95). He went on to a role in Inspector Morse, and other guest-starring roles.

After moving to the US, he gained the role of the demonic warrior Mallos on the short-lived 2000 series The Immortal, and starred in the Zalman King series chromiumblue.com. He also made guest appearances on Buffy The Vampire Slayer, G vs E and Special Unit 2, and several other series before landing a major television role as Lieutenant Malcolm Reed on Star Trek: Enterprise, which ran for four seasons. Since then, he has had guest roles on the series Las Vegas, Holby City and the CSI: NY episode "Uncertainty Rules".

Keating joined the cast of the hit show Heroes for its second season, playing an Irish mobster in a four-episode arc. He also guest-starred for three episodes on the Fox TV series Prison Break, and in 2010 guest-starred on the FX original series Sons of Anarchy.

Film
Keating has appeared in films including The Hollywood Sign and The Auteur Theory, and will be seen in the upcoming Certifiably Jonathan and Hollywood Kills, and heard in Robert Zemeckis' animated version of Beowulf. At a Star Trek convention in Sacramento, California on 9 September 2006, he announced he had been cast as an Australian scientist in the Species sequel Species IV. He has also recently appeared in several short films, including Tim Russ's Plugged (2007), a satire on modern advertising. He also appears as Sherlock Holmes's brother in the film Sherlock Holmes (2010) by the Asylum, and provided a voice-over in the Ricky Gervais film The Invention of Lying (2009).

Other work
Keating had a commercial voiceover role in an early 1990s Vidal Sassoon commercial, where his British, correct, pronunciation of "salon" resulted in a spoof on Saturday Night Live. He has recorded audiobooks, and voiced (uncredited) the minor character 'Mouse' in BioWare's Dragon Age: Origins. He recently appeared in commercials for Sprint/Nextel as fictitious British rock star Ian Westbury.

Keating has been confirmed as the voice of "Kormac the Templar" in the PC game Diablo 3 by Blizzard Entertainment; he also portrayed the dungeon boss Tirathon Saltheril in Blizzard's World of Warcraft: Legion expansion. He was the voice of Gremlin Prescott in Epic Mickey 2: The Power of Two, having provided Prescott's vocal effects in the previous game.

Filmography

Film

Television

Voice work

References

External links

 
 Dominic Keating's Official Website
 Dominic Keating's Official Fan Blog
 BBC
 StarTrek.com
 Women Talk Sci Fi Podcast interview with Dominic Keating at Australia's First Contact Conventions Trek Who Con 2011

1961 births
Living people
English male film actors
English male stage actors
English male television actors
English expatriates in the United States
English people of Irish descent
People from Leicester
People educated at Uppingham School
Alumni of University College London
Male actors from Leicestershire